Yakov Aleksandrovich Slashchov (Russian: Яков Александрович Слащёв; 10 January 1886 – 11 January 1929) was a leading commander of Baron Wrangel's Crimean army who reconciled to the Soviets and returned from Constantinople to Moscow in 1921. He was killed in his Moscow apartment by a Jew named Lazar Kalenberg, apparently in revenge for the execution of his brother.

Slashchov, known among his subordinates by the name of General Yasha, joined the Volunteer Army in December 1917 and was appointed Andrei Shkuro's chief of staff in May 1918. He was promoted to the rank of Major General in May 1919, to that of Lieutenant General in May 1920 and was put in charge of the Crimean-Azov Corps of the Volunteer Army in December 1919. He succeeded in defending the Perekop Isthmus from the Red Army in late December 1919 and prevented the Bolsheviks from penetrating the Crimea.

Slashchov and his aide Sharov were notorious for their cruelty against the Jews and looting the population (often against Wrangel's orders). Slashchov's sometimes bitter criticism of Wrangel's decisions led to his being convicted of insubordination and stripped of his rank. He retired to Constantinople where he earned his living by gardening before returning to the Soviet Crimea.

Slashov's example was instrumental in bringing many other retired White Army officers back to Soviet Russia. He published a memoir entitled The Crimea in 1920 and delivered lectures at the Vystrel Higher Officers' Courses before he was killed by a man avenging a relative's death. The circumstances leading to his death are disputed. The central character of Mikhail Bulgakov's play Flight is supposed to be based on Slashchov.

References 

1880s births
1929 deaths
Generals of the Russian Empire
White movement generals
Russian military personnel of World War I
People of the Russian Civil War
Soviet murder victims